Dee Shapiro is an American artist and writer associated with the Pattern and Decoration movement.

Biography
Dee Shapiro was inspired to be an Artist in her early years of education. Dee's career started in the 1970s as a pattern painter with her works of art included in the Pattern and Decoration at P.S. 1 in 1977. She researched and explored the Fibonacci Progression in color on graph paper and also explored geometric complexity of architectural designs, leading her to create the small horizontal oil paintings of cities and landscapes. Dee Shapiro became a Yaddo fellow in 2017.

Education and career
Dee Shapiro obtained her bachelor's degree in 1958 and Master of Science in 1960 from Queens College, City University of New York. Dee Shapiro is an artist that sees the subject on a large scale, but what she creates is on a diminutive scale. Shapiro's strength is the ability to give expressive power on canvas that makes her work seem larger than they are. Dee Shapiro has been a teacher, lecturer, and writer through career.

Group exhibitions
2018  The American Dream, Emden, Germany 
2018 “Systemic Pattern Painting” David Richard Gallery, NYC
2019  With Pleasure, Pattern and Decoration in American Art, 1972-1985, LAMOCA 2019, Hessel Museum, Bard College, Annandale on Hudson, NY  
2020  “My Corona: Ro2 Gallery, Dallas TX 
2020 “Unfinished Business." Bernay Fine Art, Great Barrington, MA
2021. "11 Women of Spirit,” Zurcher Gallery, NYC

Solo exhibitions
2016                 Art 101, Brooklyn, NY
2015                 Andre Zarre Gallery, NYC
2015                 Five Points Gallery, Torrington, CT
2012, 2010, 2009 	Andre Zarre Gallery, NYC
2010	        	Norfolk Library, Norfolk, CT
2009            	George Billis Gallery
2006            	Harrison Street Gallery, Frenchtown, NJ
2004            	The Mercy Gallery. Loomis Chafee, Windsor, CT.
2004,2002, 1998  	Andre Zarre Gallery, NY C, National Arts Club, NYC
2000	        	Principle Gallery, Alexandria, VA
1998	        	Nassau County Museum of Fine Art, Roslyn, NY
1997 		Andre Zarre Gallery, NYC
1996 		North Winds, Port Washington, NY
1994, 1991,1988,1985	Andre Zarre Gallery, NYC
1984 		Ana Sklar Gallery, Miami, FL
1983 		Andre Zarre Gallery, NYC
1982 		Everson Museum, Syracuse, NY, Andre Zarre Gallery, NYC			
1981		Dubins Gallery, Los Angeles, CA, Zenith Gallery, Pittsburgh, PA
1980, 1976	Andre Zarre Gallery, NYC
1979 		Gallery 700, Milwaukee, WI Andre Zarre GalleryNYC
1978 		St. Mary's College, Notre Dame, IN
1977 		University of Arkansas, Little Rock, AR
1975,1973 	Central Hall Gallery, Port Washington, NY, Nassau County Museum of Fine Art, Roslyn, NY

Selected bibliography
James Panero, Supreme Fiction The Hudson River School Revisited, March, 2010
Piri Halaz, From the Mayor’s Doorstep, April 2010
Steve Starger, Art New England, Dee Shapiro: “On The Horizontal,” Feb/Mar 2005
Maureen Mullarkey, The New York Sun,”The Last Time I Saw Cuba,”  April 15, 2004
James Kalm, NY ARTS, International Edition, April 2000
Helen Harrison, The New York Times, April 12, 1998, April 11, 1981
Phyllis Braff, The New York Times, 1989 
Charlotte Rubenstein, American Women Artists, Avon, 1982 
Barbara Colin, "Pattern of a Painter" New York Arts Journal, Oct-Nov 1981 
Helen Harrison, Harald Szeeman, "Pattern Paintings" D U Die Kunstzeitschrift, Zurich, June 1979
Ellen Lubell, "Lush Complexities and Visual Indulgence" SoHo Weekly News, Feb.13, 1979
Peter Frank, The Village Voice, May 1, 1979
Judith Tannenbaum, Arts Magazine, April 1978
Peter Frank, "Pattern Painting" ARTnews, February 1978
Madeline Burnside, ARTnews, April 1978
April Kingsley, "Opulent Optimism" The Village Voice, Nov.28.1977
John Canaday, "Talent Blooms" The New York Times, May 9, 1976
Malcolm Preston,  Newsday, September 18, 1976
Gordon Brown, Arts Magazine, September 1976
Ellen Lubell, "Watercolor Electricity" SoHo Weekly News, Feb.16,1975

Selected collections
A.G. Rosen Collections
Albright College Collection, Reading, PA
Albright-Knox Museum, Buffalo, NY
Aldrich Museum of Contemporary Art, Ridgefield, CT
Birmingham Museum of Art, Birmingham, AL 
Brown-Foreman, Louisville, KY
Chrysler Museum, Norfolk, VA
Citibank Collection, NYC
Dartmouth Museum of Art, Hanover, NH
Dayton Institute, Dayton, OH
Owens-Corning Corp., Corning, NY
Everson Museum of Art, Syracuse, NY
General Electric Co., Fairfield, Ct. 
Solomon R. Guggenheim Museum, NYC
Corporate Collection, Jeddah, Saudi Arabia
Heckscher Museum of Art, Huntington,[New York
Herbert F. LJohnson Museum, Ithaca NY
Hoffman-LaRoche Collection, Zurich, Switzerland
IBM Corporation, NY
Lehigh University Collection, Bethlehem, PA 
Louis-Dreyfus Financial Group
Mercer Street Medical Center, NYC
Mint Museum of Art, Charlotte, NC
Neuberger Museum, Purchase, NY
New York University Collection, NYC
Pepsico Corporation, NY
Spencer Museum of Art, Lawrence, KS
St. Mary’s College Collection, Notre Dame, IN
Texaco Corporation, NY
The New Museum, NYC
New York University Collection, NYC
The Newark Museum, Newark, NJ
United States Department of State, Washington, DC
University of Arkansas, Little Rock, AR

References

External links
 Dee Shapiro Website

People from Brooklyn
1936 births
American artists
American women writers
Living people
21st-century American women